Shirley Ann Robertson, OBE DL (born 15 July 1968) is a British sailor and Olympic gold medallist. She made it into the history books by becoming the first British woman to win an Olympic gold medal at consecutive games, Sydney 2000 and Athens 2004.

She won her first Olympic gold medal in the Europe class at the 2000 Summer Olympics. In the 2004 Summer Olympics, her crew in the Yngling class clinched the gold medal with one race to spare.

Shirley was named female World Sailor of the Year by the International Sailing Federation in 2000, and was appointed an MBE in 2000 and an OBE in 2005.

In January 2006 she became the regular presenter of Mainsail, a CNN monthly program devoted to the sailing world. She was also a commentator for the BBC's sailing coverage at the 2008 Summer Olympics. She commentated on the sailing from Weymouth for the BBC in the 2012 Olympic Games.

Personal life
Shirley was born in Dundee, but spent her early life in Menstrie in central Scotland.

Shirley married Jamie Boag in June 2006 They currently live in Cowes, on the Isle of Wight.
She also has twins called Annabel and Killian

References

External links
 Shirley Robertson website
 
 
 Article on WideWorld Magazine

ISAF World Sailor of the Year (female)
1968 births
Scottish people of Irish descent
Living people
Alumni of Heriot-Watt University
Deputy Lieutenants of the Isle of Wight
Sportspeople from Dundee
Olympic sailors of Great Britain
Sailors at the 1992 Summer Olympics – Europe
Sailors at the 1996 Summer Olympics – Europe
Sailors at the 2000 Summer Olympics – Europe
Sailors at the 2004 Summer Olympics – Yngling
Officers of the Order of the British Empire
Olympic gold medallists for Great Britain
Olympic medalists in sailing
Scottish female sailors (sport)
Scottish Olympic medallists
British female sailors (sport)
Medalists at the 2004 Summer Olympics
CNN people
Medalists at the 2000 Summer Olympics